Torsten Lubisch (born September 3, 1984) is a German sprint canoer who has competed since the late 2000s. He won a silver medal in the K-1 4 x 200 m event at the 2009 ICF Canoe Sprint World Championships in Dartmouth.

References
Canoe09.ca profile

1984 births
German male canoeists
Living people
ICF Canoe Sprint World Championships medalists in kayak